Kletenik is a surname. Notable people with the surname include:

 Gilah Kletenik, American scholar and religious leader
 Moshe Kletenik (born 1954), American rabbi
 Rivy Poupko Kletenik, American lecturer and educator

References